Honey Dew Associates, Inc., doing business as Honey Dew Donuts, is a  privately owned and operated Massachusetts-based coffeehouse chain selling donuts and other breakfast foods that operates in New England. The chain is mostly known for its donuts and coffee, but also offers sandwiches, bagels, muffins, and various types of pastries. Honey Dew Donuts opened its first restaurant in 1973 in Mansfield, Massachusetts, and is currently headquartered in Plainville, Massachusetts.  the chain had 125 restaurants in 6 states.

History

Honey Dew Donuts was founded in Mansfield, Massachusetts, by Richard J. "Dick" Bowen in 1973. In 1975, a customer suggested bringing a Honey Dew Donuts location to his community, who later became the first franchisee.

Dick Bowen was introduced to the aspect of donuts at the age of twelve by working with his father making donuts in a local donut shop in his community. He discovered his desire for a career in entrepreneurship while attending Stoughton High School, from which he graduated in 1965. After graduating from high school, Bowen enlisted in the army. He was relocated to Germany because of his deployment, where he worked as a donut baker and mechanic.

 Honey Dew Donuts has 125 franchises in New England.

Information
Honey Dew Donuts sells donuts, pastries, muffins and a variety of coffees. Their motto is "Always Fresh, Always Good!". The original Honey Dew Donuts location is in Mansfield, Massachusetts. The original Plainville, Massachusetts location was one of the first establishments in New England that constructed and utilized a drive-thru. In 2003, the franchise had 140 shops, 65 franchise families, and over 20 corporate employees. In 2012, Olivia Culpo, a Miss Rhode Island and Miss Universe winner, was featured in a Honey Dew Donuts commercial.

See also
 Boston cream donut
 List of doughnut shops

References

Doughnut shops in the United States
Food and drink companies established in 1973
Bakeries of the United States
Restaurants in Massachusetts
Restaurants established in 1975
Plainville, Massachusetts
1973 establishments in Massachusetts